The International Planetary Data Alliance (IPDA), founded in 2006, is a closely cooperating partnership to maintain the quality and performance of data (including data formats) from planetary research using instruments in space. Specific tasks include promoting the international exchange of high-quality scientific data, organized by a set of standards to facilitate data management. NASA's Planetary Data System is the de facto standard for archiving planetary data. Member organizations participate in both its Board and on specific projects related to building standards and interoperable systems.

In 2008, a Committee on Space Research (COSPAR) resolution made the IPDA an official body to set standards around the world regarding the archiving of planetary data.

See also 
Agenzia Spaziale Italiana
Le site du Centre national d'études spatiales
Centre National d'Études Spatiales
European Space Agency
German Aerospace Center
Indian Space Research Organisation
Japan Aerospace Exploration Agency
National Aeronautics and Space Administration
UK Space Agency

References

External links 
The International Planetary Data Alliance
ESA Planetary Science Archive
NASA Planetary Data System

Space organizations
International scientific organizations